Henri's Armchair is a 1974 painting by Australian artist Brett Whiteley. The work depicts the interior of Whiteley's house looking out towards Sydney Harbour and is part of the artist's Lavender Bay series. The work is named after Henri Matisse, an artist that Whiteley admired.

Whiteley sold the work to lawyer and art dealer Clive Evatt. Evatt described it as "Whiteley's finest painting". The painting has been part of several exhibitions including the Art Gallery of New South Wales Brett Whiteley studio.

In November 2020 Evatt's widow offered the painting for sale by auction. The painting sold to a private collector for a hammer price of AUD6.136m  at the time a record price for an Australian artwork at auction.

References

1974 paintings
Paintings by Brett Whiteley